The Palazzo da Mosto is a Renaissance-style palace located on Via Giovanni Battista Mari 7 in the northwest of the historic center of the town of Reggio Emilia in Italy.

The palace was commissioned in 1488 from the architect Biagio Rossetti by Francesco da Mosto, the massaro or  bailiff of the town, working under the Duke of Este. By the second half of the 19th century, the property was acquired by the wealthy banker, Pietro Manodori, who established a school for young children and infants. The property remained a school until 1991. In 2005, under the auspices of the Fondazione Manodori, a charitable arm of the Cassa di Risparmio di Reggio Emilia, the palace was restored, and now serves as an exhibition hall and for cultural events. Notable is the frieze of tondos with busts below the roofline. The interior has a baroque staircase leading to the Piano Nobile.

References

Palaces in Reggio Emilia
Renaissance architecture in Emilia-Romagna